For the Winter Olympics, there are ten venues that have been or will be used for freestyle skiing. The first FIS Freestyle World Ski Championships was held at Tignes, France, in 1986. Two years later at the Winter Olympics in Calgary, the sport was included as a demonstration event though it took place at two different locations. Becoming an official Olympic sport in 1992, the venue chosen was at Tignes, host of the 1986 world championships. The 1997 world championships at Iizuna Kogen would serve as the test event for the venue used for the 1998 Winter Olympics. Deer Valley played host to the 2002 events and would host the world championships in both 2003 and 2011. Whistler, British Columbia hosted the 2001 world championships though the 2010 venue took place at Cypress Mountain in West Vancouver close to the host city.

References

Venues
 
Freestyle skiing